Nimioglossa planicosta is a species of bristle fly in the family Tachinidae.

Distribution
Canada, United States.

References

Dexiinae
Insects described in 1945
Diptera of North America